One of a Kind is a Canadian children's television series which aired on CBC Television in 1978.

Premise
This series featured various productions for children including "Another Kind of Friendship" (Rebecca Yates and Glen Salzman producers), "The Mitt" (Michael Brownstone producer), "Monsters and other Scary Things" (Sandy Lane producer) and "Ranger Ryder and the Calgary Kid in the Adventure of the Dinosaur Badlands" (Don Elder producer and director).

Scheduling
The series was broadcast Fridays at 4:00 p.m. (Eastern) from 6 January to 31 March 1978.

References

External links
 

CBC Television original programming
1978 Canadian television series debuts
1978 Canadian television series endings